József Balogh may refer to:
 József Balogh (musician) (born 1956), Hungarian musician
 József Balogh (philologist) (1893–1944), Hungarian publicist, philologist, and literary historian
 József Balogh (politician) (born 1962), Hungarian politician
 József Balogh (mathematician) (born 1971), Hungarian mathematician

See also
Balogh (surname)